Adán Chávez Frías (born April 11, 1953) is a Venezuelan politician who was Governor of Barinas state from 2008 to 2017. Previously he was Ambassador to Cuba and then Minister of Education from 2007 to 2008. He is the elder brother of Hugo Chávez, who was President of Venezuela from 1999 to 2013, and of the Mayor of Sabaneta, Barinas, Anibal José Chávez Frías.

Guerilla affiliations
Adán studied at the University of the Andes, in Mérida where he was involved with pro-guerrilla groups prior to the election of his brother Hugo into the presidency. Through Adán, Hugo met with guerrilla fighters Douglas Bravo and William Izarra.

Political career
After Hugo was elected as president, he appointed Adán as Ambassador to Cuba.  In August 2006, Adán became Presidential Secretary, replacing Delcy Rodríguez, who reportedly disagreed with Hugo Chávez during his international tour. The Charlotte Observer reported that the author of several books on Chávez, Alberto Garrido, argued: "A much more hard-line phase [of Chávez rule] is beginning and Chávez needs a reliable and radical team around him." In January 2007, Hugo appointed Adán as Minister of Education. In 2008, he was elected as Governor of Barinas as the United Socialist Party of Venezuela (PSUV) candidate, replacing his father Hugo de los Reyes Chávez.

Chávez has been critical of the United States government, stating to PSUV members in 2018 that "we have an enemy, the American empire is our fundamental enemy, nobody can get lost in the forest of other considerations".

Sanctions

United States 
On 9 August 2017, the United States Department of the Treasury placed sanctions on Chávez for his position in the Presidential Commission in the 2017 Constituent Assembly of Venezuela.

Canada 
On 3 November 2017, the Government of Canada sanctioned Chávez as being someone who participated in "significant acts of corruption or who have been involved in serious violations of human rights".

Panama 
On 29 March 2018, Chávez was sanctioned by the Panamanian government for his alleged involvement with "money laundering, financing of terrorism and financing the proliferation of weapons of mass destruction".

References

External links
Adán Chávez asume Secretaría de la Presidencia.

1953 births
Governors of Barinas (state)
People from Barinas (state)
Chávez family
Living people
Government ministers of Venezuela
United Socialist Party of Venezuela politicians
Venezuelan socialists
People of the Crisis in Venezuela
Fifth Republic Movement politicians
Members of the Venezuelan Constituent Assembly of 1999
Members of the Venezuelan Constituent Assembly of 2017
Education ministers of Venezuela
Secretariat of the Presidency ministers of Venezuela